Fortress is an isometric scrolling shooter written by Mat Newman, developed by Amcon and released by Pace Software on cassette tape for the BBC Micro home computer in 1984. It is based on the 1982 Sega arcade game Zaxxon. The isometric perspective gameplay was relatively unique for the BBC.

Gameplay
Fortress is an isometric scrolling shooter in which the player manoeuvres a starfighter along an alley-like terrain. The player craft burns fuel rapidly (even more when flying at altitude) and fuel tanks need to be destroyed to replenish the on-board fuel tank. If the craft runs out of fuel, it crashes. The player must avoid enemy gun turrets, rocket pits and fighters, and deal with additional problems of navigating over and through walls with force fields. The player has three lives.

Completing the three stages leads to the enemy headquarters which needs to be destroyed. The game then starts over from the beginning.

References

1984 video games
BBC Micro and Acorn Electron games
BBC Micro and Acorn Electron-only games
Video game clones
Video games with isometric graphics
Video games developed in the United Kingdom